= Eduardo Bautista Legarreta =

Argentine businessman (1831–1891)

- Born: 1831; Buenos Aires, Argentina
- Died: 5 October 1891 (aged 59–60); Buenos Aires, Argentina
- Occupation: Businessman
- Spouse: Sara Carmen Lynch Videla Dorna
- Children: Sara, Carmen, Dolores, and Eduardo Legarreta Lynch

Eduardo Bautista Legarreta (1831 – 5 October 1891) was an Argentine businessman.

== Biography ==
Eduardo B. Legarreta Mosquera was born in Buenos Aires prov. in 1831. He began his career in banking at a young age, rising to the position of manager, and later engaged in commerce, accumulating significant wealth.

During the Jordanist rebellion, he supported the national authorities. In 1871, he was an active political figure in Gualeguay, Entre Ríos Province, and participated in the convention convened to debate the location of the provincial capital.

He took part in the Revolution of the year 1880, serving among the forces under Colonel Sanabria that defended Buenos Aires against the national army.

Legarreta served as president of the Buenos Aires Stock Exchange from February 1885 to February 1886 and again from January 1887 until his soon death.

During the Panic of 1890, at the request of President Carlos Pellegrini, he organized a group of businessmen and raised 16 million pesos, helping to secure an internal loan that allowed the country to meet its financial obligations.

He was a member of Argentine Freemasonry.

He died in Buenos Aires on 5 October 1891. He married Sara Carmen Lynch Videla Dorna on 21 February 1883, with whom he had four children: Sara, Carmen, Dolores, and Eduardo Legarreta Lynch.

== Bibliography ==
- Vicente Osvaldo Cutolo, Nuevo diccionario biográfico argentino (1750–1930), Editorial Elche, 1968.
- Jacinto R. Yaben, Biografías argentinas y sudamericanas, 1938.
- Eduardo Gutiérrez, La muerte de Buenos Aires, Hachette, 1959.
- Bolsa de Comercio de Buenos Aires, La Bolsa de Comercio de Buenos Aires en su centenario, 1954.
- María Amalia Duarte, Tiempos de rebelión, 1870–1873, Academia Nacional de la Historia, 1988.
